Terezya Pius Luoga Huvisa (born 12 June 1957) is a Tanzanian CCM politician and a special seat Member of Parliament since 2010. She also served as the Minister of State in the Vice President's Office for Environment from 2010 to 2014.

References

1957 births
Living people
Chama Cha Mapinduzi MPs
Tanzanian MPs 2010–2015
Bwiru Girls Secondary School alumni
Kilakala Secondary School alumni
Kivukoni College alumni
University of Dar es Salaam alumni
Sokoine University of Agriculture alumni